The 2020–21 season is the 122nd season in existence of Cardiff City Football Club. In addition to the Championship, Cardiff City will participate in this season's editions of the FA Cup, the Welsh League Cup, and participated in the EFL Cup.

First-team squad

Statistics

Players with names in italics and marked * were on loan from another club for the whole of their season with Cardiff City.

|-
|colspan=14|Players out on loan:

|-
|colspan=14|Players who left the club:

|}

Goals record

Assists record

Disciplinary record

Clean sheets
Includes all competitive matches. The list is sorted by squad number when total clean sheets are equal. Numbers in parentheses represent games where both goalkeepers participated and both kept a clean sheet; the number in parentheses is awarded to the goalkeeper who was substituted on, whilst a full clean sheet is awarded to the goalkeeper who was on the field at the start of play.

Contracts

Transfers

Transfers in

Loans in

Loans out

Transfers out

Pre-season and friendlies

Competitions

Overview

EFL Championship

League table

Results summary

Results by matchday

Matches
The 2020–21 season fixtures were released on 21 August.

FA Cup

The third round draw was made on 30 November, with Premier League and EFL Championship clubs all entering the competition.

EFL Cup

The first round draw was made on 18 August, live on Sky Sports, by Paul Merson.

Welsh League Cup
Cardiff entered the Welsh League Cup for the first time in the club's history in the 2020–21 season.

Summary

Club staff

Backroom staff

Board of directors

References

External links

Cardiff City F.C. seasons
Cardiff City
Cardiff City
Cardiff City F.C. 2020-21